Namu Myōhō Renge Kyō are Japanese words chanted within all forms of Nichiren Buddhism. In English, they mean "Devotion to the Mystic Law of the Lotus Sutra" or "Glory to the Dharma of the Lotus Sutra".

The words  refer to the Japanese title of the Lotus Sūtra.

Believers claim that the purpose of chanting is to reduce suffering by eradicating negative karma along with reducing karmic punishments both from previous and present lifetimes, with the goal of attaining perfect and complete awakening.

Early Buddhist proponents
The mantra is an homage to the Lotus Sutra. In Nichiren's writings, he frequently quotes passages from the Lotus in which the Buddha declared it to be his highest teaching. These passages include: "I have preached various sutras and among those sutras the Lotus is the foremost!;" "Among all the sutras, it holds the highest place,;" and "This sutra is king of the sutras".

According to Jacqueline Stone, the Tendai founder Saicho popularized the mantra  "as a way to honor the Lotus Sutra as the One Vehicle teaching of the Buddha."

Accordingly, the Tendai monk Genshin popularized the mantra  to honor the three jewels of Japanese Buddhism.

Nichiren
The Japanese Buddhist priest Nichiren was a known advocate of this recitation, claiming it is the exclusive method to happiness and salvation suited for the Third Age of Buddhism. According to varying believers, Nichiren cited the mantra in his Ongi Kuden, a transcription of his lectures about the Lotus Sutra, Namu is a transliteration into Japanese of the Sanskrit namas, and Myōhō Renge Kyō is the Sino-Japanese pronunciation of the Chinese title of the Lotus Sutra (hence, Daimoku, which is a Japanese word meaning 'title'), in the translation by Kumārajīva. Nichiren gives a detailed interpretation of each character (see Ongi kuden#The meaning of Nam(u) Myōhō Renge Kyō) in this text.

Namu is used in Buddhism as a prefix expressing taking refuge in a Buddha or similar object of veneration. Among varying Nichiren sects, the phonetic use of Nam versus Namu is a linguistic but not a dogmatic issue, due to common contractions and u is devoiced in many varieties of Japanese words.

Namu — Myōhō — Renge — Kyō consists of the following:

 Namu  "devoted to", a transliteration of Sanskrit  .
 Myōhō  "exquisite law"
 Myō , from Middle Chinese mièw, "strange, mystery, miracle, cleverness" (cf. Mandarin )
 Hō , from Middle Chinese pjap, "law, principle, doctrine" (cf. Mand. )
 Renge-kyō  "Lotus Sutra"
 Renge  "padma (Lotus)"
 Ren , from Middle Chinese len, "lotus" (cf. Mand. )
 Ge , from Middle Chinese xwæ, "flower" (cf. Mand. )
 Kyō , from Middle Chinese kjeng, "sutra" (cf. Mand. )

The Lotus Sutra is held by Nichiren Buddhists, as well as practitioners of the Tiantai and corresponding Japanese Tendai schools, to be the culmination of Shakyamuni Buddha's fifty years of teaching.

However, followers of Nichiren Buddhism consider  to be the name of the ultimate law permeating the universe, in unison with human life which can manifest realization, sometimes termed as "Buddha Wisdom" or "attaining Buddhahood",  through select Buddhist practices.

Associations to cinema

 1947 – It was used in the 1940s in India to commence the Interfaith prayer meetings of Mahatma Gandhi, followed by verses of the Bhagavad Gita.
 1958 – The mantra also appears in the 1958 American romantic film The Barbarian and the Geisha, where it was recited by a Buddhist priest during a Cholera outbreak.
 1958 – Japanese film Nichiren to Mōko Daishūrai (English: Nichiren and the Great Mongol Invasion) is a 1958 Japanese film directed by Kunio Watanabe.
 1968 – The mantra was used in the final episode of The Monkees to break Peter out of a trance.
 1969 – The mantra is present in original version of the film Satyricon by Federico Fellini during the grand nude jumping scene of the patricians.
 1973 – In Hal Ashby's film The Last Detail, an American Navy prisoner, Larry Meadows (played by Randy Quaid), being escorted by shore patrol attends a Nichiren Shoshu of America meeting where he is introduced to the mantra; the Meadows character continues to chant during the latter part of the film.
 1976 – In the film Zoku Ningen Kakumei (Human Revolution) produced by the Soka Gakkai, a fictionalized religious drama featuring the struggles of Tsunesaburo Makiguchi who is showcased chanting the words during World War II.
 1979 – Nichiren is a 1979 Japanese film directed by Noboru Nakamura. Produced by Masaichi Nagata and based on Matsutarō Kawaguchi's novel. The film is known for mentioning Jinshiro Kunishige as one of the martyrs persecuted, claimed to whom the Dai Gohonzon was inscribed by Nichiren in honor of his memory.
 1980 – In Louis Malle's acclaimed film Atlantic City, Hollis McLaren's Chrissie, the pregnant, naive hippie sister of main character Sally (Susan Sarandon) is discovered hiding, fearful and chanting the mantra after witnessing violent events.
 1987 – The mantra is used by the underdog fraternity in the film Revenge of the Nerds II in the fake Seminole temple against the Alpha Betas.
 1987 – In the film Innerspace, Tuck Pendleton (played by Dennis Quaid) chants this mantra repeatedly as he encourages Jack Putter to break free from his captors and charge the door of the van he is being held in.
 1993 – American-born artist Tina Turner through her autobiographical film What's Love Got To Do With It details her conversion to Nichiren Shoshu Buddhism in 1973. In a film scene after an attempted suicide, Turner begins to chant this mantra and turns her life around. Turner continues to chant this mantra in public venues and numerous publications. Turner recited these words again on 21 February 1997, through a televised interview with Larry King, by which Turner credits her continuing practice to the Soka Gakkai International.
 1993 – In the December 9, 1993 episode of The Simpsons entitled The Last Temptation of Homer, Homer Simpson attempts to read notes he had written on his hand to guide him during an awkward conversation with a colleague, but the notes have become smeared because of sweat. In his attempt to recite his notes, Homer unknowingly babbles the chant.
 2019 – Actor Orlando Bloom appeared in a video interview for Soka Gakkai USA in January 2019, citing his practice of chanting Nam Myōhō Renge Kyō since the age of 16 in London.
2019 - The documentary film, "Buster Williams, From Bass to Infinity", directed by Adam Kahan. Jazz bassist, Buster Williams, is a Buddhist practitioner and chants with his wife during the film.

Associations to music
The words appear in songs including:
 "Welcome Back Home" — The Byrds
 "Let Go and Let God" — Olivia Newton-John
 "Nam Myoho Renge Kyo" — Yoko Ono
 "Boots of Chinese Plastic" — The Pretenders
 "Concentrate" — Xzibit
 "B R Right" — Trina (2002)
 "Beyond" — Tina Turner (2015)
 "Cleopatra" — Samira Efendi (2020)
 "They Say" — Conner Reeves (1997)
 "Creole Lady" — Jon Lucien (1975)
 "Nam Myo Ho" — Indian Ocean (2003)
 "Tribute to The Mentor" — Alan Smallwood (2008)
 "No More Parties in L.A." — Kanye West (2016)
 "The Chant" – Lighthouse (1970)
 "Spend a Little Doe" - Lil Kim (1996)
 "Sha" - Ugly (UK) (2022) 
 "Renge Kyo" - Takkra (2021)

See also 
 Index of Buddhism-related articles
 Kotodama

Notes

References

Sources

Further reading
 Causton, Richard: The Buddha in Daily Life, An Introduction of Nichiren Buddhism, Rider London 1995; 
 Hochswender, Woody: The Buddha in Your Mirror: Practical Buddhism and the Search for Self, Middleway Press 2001; 
 Montgomery, Daniel B.: Fire In The Lotus, The Dynamic Buddhism of Nichiren, Mandala 1991; 
 Payne, Richard, K. (ed.): Re-Visioning Kamakura Buddhism, University of Hawaii Press Honolulu 1998; 
 Stone, Jacqueline, I.: "Chanting the August Title of the Lotus Sutra: Daimoku Practices in Classical and Medieval Japan". In: Payne, Richard, K. (ed.); Re-Visioning Kamakura Buddhism, University of Hawaii Press, Honolulu 1998, pp. 116–166. 

Buddhist mantras
Nichiren Buddhism
Buddhist devotion